Galugah (also Romanized as Galūgāh; also known as Soleymānī) is a village in Zirab Rural District, in the Central District of Zarrin Dasht County, Fars Province, Iran. At the 2006 census, its population was 996, in 206 families.

References 

Populated places in Zarrin Dasht County